Yang Wei (born February 8, 1980, in Xiantao, Hubei) is a male gymnast from China.

Career
Yang Wei won the silver medal in the individual all-around competition and won the gold in the team event at the 2000 Olympics in Sydney.

In 2003, he again won the gold in the team event and silver in the all-around competition at the 2003 World Artistic Gymnastics Championships in Anaheim.

At the 2004 Olympics in Athens, his world championship winning team finished fifth after many of them fell. Wei was also the favorite to win the gold medal at the Individual All-Around in Athens as well, but a fall from the high bar earned him a low score of 8.975 and put him out of medal contention.  He placed seventh that night.  The Chinese team redeemed itself by taking gold in the 2008 Olympics in Beijing, beating out Japan and the United States.

Yang returned to form at the 2006 World Artistic Gymnastics Championships in Aarhus, by winning gold in the team event, individual all-around and parallel bars competitions. He also won gold medal in the team event, individual all-around, rings and parallel bars competitions at the 2006 Asian Games.

He successfully defended his team and all-around titles at the 2007 World Artistic Gymnastics Championships in Stuttgart, and won the all-around and rings at the Chinese National Championships in 2007 and 2008.

Yang Wei won gold in the individual all-around and the team final at the 2008 Olympics in Beijing. He also won a silver in the rings event final and placed fourth in the pommel horse  event final.

Yang Wei is best known for his impressive difficulty scores across the six events.

Personal life
Yang Wei has a long-time relationship with former gymnast, Yang Yun, who is an Olympic bronze medalist (uneven bars) for China, and now a CCTV reporter. In June 2006, Yang Wei invited Yang Yun to a news conference, which turned out to be a ploy for him to surprise her with a proposal. While he trained for the Beijing Olympic Games, the two had very few chances to be together, and kept in touch through text messaging. After his Olympic gold in the All-Around in Beijing on Thursday, Yang Wei faced the camera and mouthed the words, "I love you," to his fiancée. Yang Yun, who watched his victory on television, shouted "I love you, too!" back to the screen. Yang Wei: "Gold Medal for my Love!"  The two married on November 6, 2008.  Their son, Yang Wenchang, was born November 2009. Their twin daughters were born in 2017.

References

External links
 19 February 2012 Chinese acrobatics onboard CAMPER, Volvo Ocean Race, youtube.com
 
 

1980 births
Living people
Chinese male artistic gymnasts
Medalists at the World Artistic Gymnastics Championships
Gymnasts at the 2000 Summer Olympics
Gymnasts at the 2004 Summer Olympics
Gymnasts at the 2008 Summer Olympics
Olympic gold medalists for China
Olympic gymnasts of China
Olympic silver medalists for China
People from Xiantao
World champion gymnasts
Olympic medalists in gymnastics
Gymnasts from Hubei
Medalists at the 2008 Summer Olympics
Asian Games medalists in gymnastics
Gymnasts at the 1998 Asian Games
Gymnasts at the 2002 Asian Games
Gymnasts at the 2006 Asian Games
Medalists at the 2000 Summer Olympics
Asian Games gold medalists for China
Asian Games silver medalists for China
Asian Games bronze medalists for China
Medalists at the 1998 Asian Games
Medalists at the 2002 Asian Games
Medalists at the 2006 Asian Games